Michael Robert Socha (born 13 December 1987) is an English actor, known for his roles in the films This Is England and Summer, and the television series This Is England '86, '88, '90, Being Human, Once Upon a Time in Wonderland and the BBC Three miniseries Our World War.

Early life
Socha was born in Derby, Derbyshire, England, to Kathleen Lyons ("Kath") and Robert Socha, on 13 December 1987. He is the older brother of actress Lauren Socha, star of the Channel 4 comedy-drama Misfits. Socha was brought up in Littleover, a suburb of Derby, and attended St Benedict Catholic School. Socha was a rebellious pupil. He often skipped school, but when forced to attend he tried to make it fun by doing the things he was most interested in. When Socha was 12, his mother read in a local newspaper about a play being cast by the Chellaston Youth Players. She asked her son and daughter if they wanted to try out for it, and both did. Socha's motivation for auditioning was his anger at being denied a role in the musical and his desire to prove his teachers wrong about his acting skills. He won the lead role of Bugsy Malone in the play. He acted in several plays for the group, but by his own admission did not take acting very seriously.

Through teachers at Socha's school the family learned about the Central Junior Television Workshop a free actors' workshop for young people from the Nottingham area. He enrolled in the course when he was 14, but was almost refused admission as he had failed to learn the monologue for his audition and was put in the "reserve group". His second audition went the same way, but the programme relented and allowed him in after a time. Socha says the workshop had a strong impact on him, and he began working hard at acting. His first professional role came when he was cast in a small part in a short film. He was quickly cast in several small parts subsequently, and hired an agent.

Socha's father had a long history of alcohol abuse, and his parents separated. In 2004, Robert Socha died of an alcohol-related heart attack. According to Kathleen, the death of his father made her son very independent. "Michael was walking the streets of London at 16 going to auditions. He had to because I was working. He'd go off with a map and Tube fare."

Socha liked drama, English and history courses, however, and received his GCSEs in those three subjects. He credits his teacher, Mrs Urquhart-Hughes, as someone who watched over him, motivated him, and got him to do his homework after school.

His first job after leaving school was in a manufacturing factory. He disliked it and quit, and enrolled at Burton & South Derbyshire College, a further education school. He worked at two other factories after leaving school, as well as at a car wash. He also worked as a labourer for his uncle's bricklaying firm, mixing mortar for the bricklayers. But as he was constantly taking time off work at the last moment to attend auditions he quit working full-time and dedicated himself to acting.

Career
Socha's breakthrough role came early in his acting career. In 2006, he was cast as school bully Harvey in Shane Meadows skinhead subculture film, This Is England.

In 2008, he was cast in Kenneth Glenaan's BAFTA Scotland-award winning film Summer, where he acted opposite Robert Carlyle. The same year, he appeared in Duane Hopkins film Better Things and the independent small-budget comedy Dogging: A Love Story. He also appeared in three episodes of the BBC One medical drama Casualty. In February 2009, Socha made his stage debut at Nottingham Playhouse in Glamour, a comedy by Stephen Lowe. The same year, he appeared in an episode of the science fiction police drama Paradox on BBC One and in the made-for-television film The Unloved for Channel 4.

Despite his initial success, Socha was "penniless" and "waiting for work" for much of 2009 and early 2010, sitting at home and watching daytime television. His next big break came when Shane Meadows asked him to reprise the role of Harvey the bully for a four-part television series for Channel 4. The series, This Is England '86, follows the lives of the film's characters three years after the events originally depicted. It aired in September 2010. That same year, Socha appeared in an episode of the hit television comedy Married Single Other as well as the film Bonded by Blood. He also appeared in the This Is England Christmas special, and in a music video with American soul music singer Lauren Pritchard. In 2011, he played William Price in Helen Edmundson's adaptation of Anna of the Five Towns on BBC Radio 4.

Socha appeared in BBC Three hit supernatural series Being Human in 2011, receiving good critical notice as the innocent young werewolf Tom McNair. He almost did not appear on the show. He missed his audition after a taxicab hit him and fled the scene while he was helping a friend move furniture across a road in Normanton. Although only bruised, he missed his audition and had to plead for a second chance. He won the role of Tom, a young werewolf who has been brought up in the wild by his father and taught to hunt vampires. During his time on Being Human, Socha says he became good friends with Russell Tovey and co-star Robson Green. Socha has admitted that he can get carried away while performing some of his more physically demanding scenes. On another occasion, acting out a werewolf transformation in a metal cage, he almost injured himself after his physical acting became too extreme. He has received at least seven minor injuries requiring medical treatment and reporting to authorities.

Socha was upgraded from a recurring role to the main cast for the fourth series of Being Human, after the previous main cast, including Tovey, left the show. The fourth series started airing in February 2012.
He also appeared in the music video to the Jake Bugg song "Seen It All" and in the music video to the Lauren Pritchard song "Stuck".

In 2013, Socha portrayed the Knave of Hearts in Once Upon a Time in Wonderland, a spin-off to the ABC fantasy series Once Upon a Time. He also starred in Chris Coghill's film Spike Island, based upon The Stone Roses gig of the same name. After Once Upon a Time in Wonderland'''s cancellation, it was confirmed that Socha would be a main cast member in the fourth season of Once Upon A Time.

He also starred in the film Svengali in which he played a guitarist in a band and in the film Twenty8k in which he played a drug dealer.

2016 saw Socha take the lead in the E4 series The Aliens and he has starred in two films currently in production (Double Date and a remake of the 1973 film Papillon) with 2017 release dates to be confirmed.

In 2017, Socha played King Richard III in the music video titled 'ill Ray (the king)' by British Indie rock group Kasabian.

In 2018 he played Bill Twist, the St Helens Town F.C. captain, in the film The Keeper (2018 film), a biographical story of the footballing life of Bert Trautmann.

In 2019 August, Socha played the main cast in the music videos titled “something about you” - which was written by Elderbrook and Rudimental. In which he played a member of a therapy group, which highlights struggles between males and showing the other side of masculinity to one another.

In 2021, the BBC announced that Socha had been cast as King David Hartley, leader of the Cragg Vale Coiners, in Shane Meadows' period drama, The Gallows Pole''.

Personal life
Socha has a son with his then girlfriend, Faye. In an interview with the Evening Standard in 2016, Faye was mentioned as his ex-partner and it is not publicly known whether they have reconciled.

Filmography

Film and television

Stage

Radio

Music video

References

External links 
 
 
 

Living people
English male television actors
1987 births
Alumni of Burton College
English male film actors
Male actors from Derbyshire
People from Littleover
English people of Portuguese descent
21st-century English male actors